John Coterell (fl. 1390–1421) of Wallingford, Berkshire, was an English Member of Parliament for Wallingford in January 1390, 1393, 1394, 1395, Jan. 1397, Sept. 1397, 1410, 1420 and May 1421.

References

14th-century births
15th-century deaths
English MPs January 1390
English MPs 1393
English MPs 1394
English MPs 1395
English MPs January 1397
English MPs 1410
English MPs 1420
English MPs May 1421
Members of the Parliament of England for Berkshire
English MPs September 1397